Leading Creek may refer to:

Leading Creek (Ohio) in Ohio, a tributary of the Ohio River
Leading Creek (Little Kanawha River) in West Virginia
Leading Creek (Tygart Valley River) in West Virginia

See also 
 Leading (disambiguation)